"Gambler" is a song by American singer Madonna from the soundtrack album to the 1985 film Vision Quest. The song was written solely by Madonna, while the production was handled by John "Jellybean" Benitez at her request. It was released as the second single from the film's soundtrack album  on October 3, 1985, by Geffen Records. "Gambler" was never released as a single in the United States, at the request of Madonna's own Sire Records. The music video of the song is an excerpt from the film.

Musically, "Gambler" is an upbeat synth-pop and disco song, featuring instrumentation from drums, electronic handclaps and percussion, which is accompanied by a bass synth and keyboards. The lyrics talk about Madonna asserting her self-independence. Critics gave a mixed review of the song, but it was commercially successful, reaching the top-ten in the charts of Australia, Belgium, Ireland, Netherlands, Norway and the United Kingdom. Madonna has performed the song only once, on her 1985 the Virgin Tour, which was documented on the live video release Madonna Live: The Virgin Tour.

Background
After the recording of "Crazy for You" for the 1985 coming-of-age drama film Vision Quest, Madonna decided to record two more songs, "Gambler" and "Warning Signs", both written entirely by her. However, only "Crazy for You" and "Gambler" made it onto the final track listing of the film's soundtrack album, with "Warning Signs" remaining commercially unreleased. Of the selection, music director Phil Ramone felt that "Gambler" was appropriate for the film's opening shots. Madonna explained that the song "is really the girl's point of view, because she's, like, an unstoppable person... She doesn't really need this guy". "Gambler" remained the last single written solely by Madonna until "Hey You" (2007). In a 1991 interview with Rolling Stone, she said that she got "lazy" to write songs without a collaborator. Madonna approached her then-boyfriend John "Jellybean" Benitez to produce "Gambler".

As the song was recorded on the Geffen label, a commercial issue of the single, in the United States was suppressed, at the request of Madonna's Sire Records management. They feared that commercial availability of another Madonna single would have been detrimental to the other singles from the Like a Virgin album, and the already available, Geffen-distributed, "Crazy for You". Hence "Gambler" was neither commercially released nor sent for airplay in the United States. The UK 12" single, contained the Extended Dance Mix, Instrumental Remix, and the song "Nature of the Beach" by Black 'n Blue.  The 7" single had the original version, and "Nature of the Beach". The video for "Gambler" is similar to "Crazy for You", with Madonna singing the song along with clips culled from Vision Quest. Madonna filmed her performance on November 22, 1983, at the Big Foot Tavern in Spokane, Washington. On December 9, 2022, nearly forty years after its release, the single was released, upon personal request by Madonna, to streaming services.

Composition

Musically, "Gambler" is an upbeat song that combines elements of synth-pop and disco, composed in the style of the songs on Madonna's self-titled debut album. The song features instrumentation from drums, electronic handclaps and percussion, which is accompanied by a bass synths and keyboards. The song starts with an initial four-chord chorus, and a brief three-chord verse, eventually reaching a middle eight, where Madonna's voice is in echoes. Near the end, the coda of the song uses a new musical sequence, with some whistling, and the line "You can't stop me now" ending echoes.

According to the sheet music published at Musicnotes.com by Alfred Publishing, the song is set in the time signature of common time, with a tempo of 100 beats per minute. Madonna's vocal range spans from B3 to E5. "Gambler" is composed in the key of D minor and has a basic sequence of Dm–G–Dm–G–Dm–G–Am as its chord progression. The lyrics have Madonna asserting her independence and daredevil attitude towards life, to a lover who, according to her, would not be able to understand or put up with her speed.

Critical reception
Rikky Rooksby, author of The Complete Guide to the Music of Madonna, compared the song to the music of the band Blondie, and said: "The rapid movement through the various sections, can't save the song from being fairly ordinary, but it passes quick enough. Bit like 24-hour flu, really." Alex Henderson from AllMusic called the song "an ultra-infectious gem that, unfortunately, isn't on any of the [Madonna's] CDs" and felt that "'Gambler' is one of those songs that should have been a major hit but wasn't, whereas 'Crazy for You' soared to the top of the pop charts." Alfred Soto of Stylus Magazine, described "Gambler" as a "disco-punk, Flashdance edition" and called it "the most aggressive track of Madonna's career." Soto added, "'Gambler' is the only possible response to a slow dance in which you were left as unfulfilled as you were five minutes earlier. It deserves immortality beside 'Into the Groove' [...] The music is keyed to her vocals—insistent, strident, hip-thrusting; she slurs the line 'You're just jealous 'cuz you can't be me' like it's a shot of Rumplemints; meanwhile Animotion synths blow up her skirt." Robert Christgau gave a mixed review of the song.

R. Serge Denisoff and William D. Romanowski, authors of Risky business: rock in film, felt that the song seemed "jammed into the movie with a plunger and little thought to appropriateness." The Motion Picture Guide of 1986 included the song as one of the soundtrack's standouts. In March 2023, Billboard ranked it as the singer's 92nd greatest song; Andrew Unterberger called it "the unofficial end of the Like a Virgin era, her final jolt of gooey synth-pop before moving onto weightier fare with True Blue. It's a blast, though it sounds like she could've tossed it off in the dressing room ten minutes earlier". Slant Magazines Ed Gonzalez wrote: "['Gambler'] is what 'Dress You Up' would sound like after six vodka pineapples [...] To think what could have been had she brought a sneaking sense of vulnerability to what is, at heart, an emancipation proclamation, but it's an otherwise infectious marriage between Madonna's assertiveness and 'Jellybean' Benitez's all-pelvic-thrust production". Rolling Stone called it an "urgent-sounding dance track" whose "assertive feel jelled well with [Vision Quests] theme, especially the story of its hard-to-get heroine (played by Linda Fiorentino)". The Guardians Jude Rogers called it "an awkward, pleasingly punky track".

Chart performance
"Gambler" was released in October 1985 in the United Kingdom, and debuted at position 20 on the UK Singles Chart. After two weeks it peaked at number four, and was present for a total of 14 weeks. By the end of 1985, Madonna achieved up another record with the song, becoming the first female artist to have eight UK top-ten singles in one calendar year. The song was certified silver by the British Phonographic Industry (BPI) for shipment of 250,000 copies of the single. According to the Official Charts Company, the song has sold 295,000 copies there. In Australia, "Gambler" debuted on the Kent Music Report at number 51, and at number 17 in the top 50, reaching a peak of number ten. In Germany, the song debuted at number 39 on the Media Control Charts, and reached a peak of number 25 after five weeks, being present on the chart for a total of 12 weeks. Across Europe, the song reached the top-ten of the charts in Belgium, Ireland, Netherlands and Norway. It also reached peaks of number 23 in Switzerland and number 45 in New Zealand.

Live performance
Madonna performed this song live only on the Virgin Tour in 1985. It was the first song of the second act of the show. Madonna wore a black, fringed micro-top and similar skirt, with her belly-button exposed, and a number of crucifixes in different sizes, hanging from different parts of her body. As the guitar intro of the song started, Madonna appeared on the side-stage and started dancing energetically with lights flashing on her. While singing the song, she sometimes opened her jacket and sometimes straddled the steel structure present on the stage. The performance ended with Madonna jumping off the side stage, onto the main stage. It was included on the video release, Madonna Live: The Virgin Tour, which was shot in Detroit.

Formats and track listings
 Standard 7-inch single
 "Gambler" (LP version) – 3:54
 "Nature of the Beach" (Black 'n Blue) – 3:45
 UK and Dutch 12-inch single
 "Gambler" (extended dance mix) – 5:34
 "Gambler" (instrumental remix) – 3:55
 "Nature of the Beach" (Black 'n Blue) – 3:45
 Digital single
 "Gambler" (7" version) – 3:51
 "Gambler" (extended dance mix) – 5:34
 "Gambler" (instrumental remix) – 3:55

Credits and personnel
 Madonna – writer, vocals
 John "Jellybean" Benitez – producer
 Stephen Bray – arranger
 Greg Fulginiti – mastering
 John Kalodner – executive producer
 Armando Gallo - photography
 Tomcat - sleeve design

Credits adapted from the soundtrack and 7" single liner notes.

Charts

Weekly charts

Year-end charts

Certifications and sales

References

Bibliography

 
 
 
 
 
 
 

1985 singles
1985 songs
CBS Records singles
Geffen Records singles
Madonna songs
Songs written by Madonna
American synth-pop songs
American disco songs
Songs written for films
Song recordings produced by John Benitez